The Aero A.200 was a sportsplane of Czechoslovakia, designed and built specifically to compete in Challenge 1934, the European touring plane championships. It was a four-seater low-wing  monoplane.

Operational service
Flown in competition by Ján Ambruš, the A.200 took fourth place, beaten by the RWD-9 (that took both first and second places for Poland) and the Fieseler Fi 97 (from Germany). The other A.200, flown by Vojtěch Žaček, took the 14th place for 34 competitors. They carried registrations OK-AMA and OK-AMB.

In a technical evaluation, A.200s scored the 4th result from among aircraft types taking part in the Challenge. They had the best short take-off capabilities in the contest – A.200s needed 74.5-77.6 m to take off and fly over 8-m high gate, although they needed some 118 m to land from above the gate.

Description
Mixed construction low-wing monoplane, braced with wire. Fuselage of a steel frame, covered with wood and canvas, elliptical in cross-section. Rectangular wings of wooden construction, canvas covered, fitted with all-span slats and with flaps. Wings were folding rearwards. Cab had two seats side by side in front, with twin controls, and two seats in the rear, under a common multi-part canopy. Fixed landing gear with a rear skid. Radial engine in fuselage nose, with NACA cowling. Two-blade propeller.

Specifications (A.200)

See also

References
Marian Krzyżan: "Międzynarodowe turnieje lotnicze 1929-1934", Warsaw 1988,   (Polish language)

External links

Photo on Challenge 1934 page

1930s Czechoslovakian sport aircraft
Low-wing aircraft
A200
Single-engined tractor aircraft
Aircraft first flown in 1934